Chicken Skin Music is Ry Cooder's fifth studio album, released in 1976, on the Reprise label.

Reception 

Reviewing the album for AllMusic, Brett Hartenbach said: "Even more than usual, Cooder refuses to recognize borders -- geographical or musical -- presenting "Stand By Me" as a gospel song with a norteño arrangement, or giving the Jim Reeves country-pop classic, "He'll Have to Go," a bolero rhythm, featuring the interplay of Flaco Jimenez's accordion and Pat Rizzo's alto sax. [...] This is not merely eclecticism for its own sake. Chicken Skin Music is probably Ry Cooder's most eccentric record since his first, but it's also one of his most entertaining."

Writing for ZigZag magazine in November 1976, Andy Childs said: "Apart from the obvious quality of his music, there's something about his total detachment from the very formalised and generally uninspiring rock'n'roll circus that I find very appealing. ... There's so much music here, so much fascinating and enlightening music. How many so-called artists can really claim to make albums that are truly both educational and so immensely enjoyable?" Time magazine once said that "Ry Cooder makes America come together in its music...well, now he's stretching his musical horizons to other shores, and the results, even though he's probably just begun, are just as cohesive...a pure joy – a work of art even."

Track listing

Personnel
Sources:Chicken Skin Music, (1976) Reprise Records, CD: 7599-27231-2 - Notes booklet

Musicians

George Bohanon – baritone horn and horn arrangement on "I Got Mine"
Oscar Brashear – cornet on "I Got Mine"
Red Callender – upright bass
Ry Cooder – bajo sexto, mandola, bottleneck guitar, French accordion, electric guitar, slack-key guitar, tiple, Hawaiian guitar, vocals
Chris Ethridge – bass guitar
Jimmy Adams - vocals
Terry Evans – vocals
Cliff Givens – vocals
Laurence Fishburne - vocals
Hugo Gonzales – bajo sexto on "Good Night Irene"
Milt Holland – percussion, drums
Atta Isaacs – slack-key and acoustic guitar on "Chloe"
Fred Jackson Jr. – tenor saxophone on "I Got Mine"
Flaco Jiménez – accordion on "He'll Have to Go", "Stand By Me" and "Goodnight Irene"
Herman E. Johnson – vocals
Jim Keltner – drums
Bobby King – vocals
Henry Ojeda – bass on "Good Night Irene"
Gabby Pahinui – steel guitar on "Chloe"
Benny Powell – trombone on "I Got Mine"
Pat Rizzo – alto saxophone on "He'll Have to Go"
Russ Titelman – bajo sexto on "Stand By Me"
Frank Villarreal - alto saxophone on "Good Night Irene"
Isaac Garcia - drums on "Good Night Irene"

Technical
Ry Cooder – producer
Judy Maizel, Trudy Portch - production coordination
Lee Herschberg - engineer, mixing
Lloyd Cruft -  engineer
Bobby Hata, John Neal - assistant engineers
Chet Himes, John Ingle - engineering
Kenny Price - album cover, design and painting
Susan Titelman - photography
Noel Newbolt - production assistance

Releases
 CD	Chicken Skin Music Reprise	 1988
 Cassette	Chicken Skin Music Reprise	 1990
 CD	Chicken Skin Music Reprise	 1990
 CD	Chicken Skin Music WEA	 2007
 CD	Chicken Skin Music Reprise	 2008

Singles
"He'll Have To Go" / "The Bourgeois Blues", Reprise: K 14457 (UK)
"Goodnight Irene" / "Chloe", Reprise: K REP14473 (Netherlands)

Charts

Album

References

1976 albums
Ry Cooder albums
Albums produced by Ry Cooder
Reprise Records albums
Covers albums